Teddy Seidenfeld is an American statistician and philosopher currently the H. A. Simon University Professor at Carnegie Mellon University.

References

Year of birth missing (living people)
Living people
Carnegie Mellon University faculty
American philosophers